Seneasha Creek is a stream in the U.S. state of Mississippi.

Seneasha is a name derived from the Choctaw language purported to mean either "sycamores are there" or "sycamore river". Variant names are "Seneatcha", "Senesha Creek", and "Sineasha".

References

Rivers of Mississippi
Rivers of Attala County, Mississippi
Mississippi placenames of Native American origin